Kfar Aviv (lit. Village of Spring) is a moshav in the Central District of Israel, near Ashdod. It belongs to the Gederot Regional Council.

History
Kfar Aviv was founded in 1952 by the Jewish Agency on the lands of the Palestinian village of Yibna. The settlement was intended to absorb Jewish immigrants and refugees from Egypt. Its original name was Kfar HaYeor (lit. Village of the Nile). The name "Kfar Aviv" was given as a reference to the Exodus of the Jews from Egypt, which occurred in spring as recorded in the Torah (Exodus 34:18). As time passed, the village absorbed families from Poland.

The land area used for farming covers about 2,000 dunams. Most inhabitants of the village work elsewhere.

References

Moshavim
Populated places in Central District (Israel)
Populated places established in 1951
1951 establishments in Israel
Egyptian-Jewish culture in Israel
Polish-Jewish culture in Israel